Bawri may refer to:

 Bagri language, a language of Rajasthan and the Punjab region of India and Pakistan
 Bawri, a dialect of the Jaunsari language of Uttarakhand, India